Stephen Hall (born 17 May 1969) is an Australian actor, writer and producer.

Career

Television
Hall's career in television includes acting, writing and production duties. He was the host of Under Melbourne Tonight, a weekly live variety hour television program produced by RMITV that broadcast on C31 Melbourne from 1993 to 1998. He has appeared in the long-running television series Neighbours, and in 2008 he performed the role of Warren in the Australian Broadcasting Corporation (ABC) television comedy series The Hollowmen 

He has also appeared in telemovies, including The King (2007), playing the role of Bert Newton.

As a producer, he worked on the Australian version of the game show Deal or No Deal.

As a TV writer he has worked on many Australian comedy and light entertainment TV productions, such as BackBerner, Big Bite, Full Frontal, and Spicks and Specks. He was a writer on the third series of the weekly satirical comedy programme Newstopia, broadcast on SBS in 2008. From 2009 to 2012, Hall served as head writer on the comedy game show Talkin' 'bout Your Generation. In 2013, he wrote for ABC-TV's weekly satirical comedy show Shaun Micallef's Mad as Hell, and Adam Hills Tonight series 2, of which he was also the Studio Producer.

As of 2014, Hall is a regular cast member on Shaun Micallef's Mad As Hell, with popular characters including the political spokesman Darius Horsham.

Film
Hall's movie career includes appearances in Romper Stomper, The Wog Boy, Now Add Honey, That's Not My Dog and Fraud Festival.

Theatre
Hall starred in the original Australian professional production of Monty Python's Spamalot in 2007, playing the roles of Lancelot, The French Taunter, Tim The Enchanter and The Head Knight of "Ni".

In 2011, Hall co-wrote (with Michael Ward) the comedy stage show Bond-A-Rama! Every James Bond Film Live On Stage, in which he played the roles of Sean Connery, Roger  Moore and Pierce Brosnan. The show was a sell out, prompting a second season in 2012.

In 2013, Hall wrote, produced and performed in the one man stage show Raiders of the Temple of Doom's Last Crusade; One Man Performs Three Indiana Jones Movies in One Hour, for the Melbourne Fringe Festival. The show was then revived for a successful season in the 2014 Melbourne International Comedy Festival.

In March 2016, John Cleese cast Hall as Basil Fawlty in Cleese's own stage adaptation of his TV series 'Fawlty Towers'. 'Fawlty Towers Live' opened in Sydney at the Roslyn Packer Theatre in August 2016, and toured Australia, running for 157 performances before finishing in Brisbane on 22 January 2017. The show received favourable reviews in each city it played in.

Cartoon voice actor
Hall is an experienced voice actor for animation, playing characters in Cartoon Network's Monster Beach and Exchange Student Zero, along with roles in Kitty Is Not a Cat, Get Ace and Pacific Heat... as seen in this showreel.

Author

In September 2015, Hall released his first eBook How To Win Game Shows, which is a 197-page compilation of winning tips, hints and techniques plus interviews with game show champions, hosts, producers and question writers.

From May 2019 to May 2020, Hall wrote the first draft of his science fiction adventure novel Symphony Under Siege, releasing a new chapter online each week, at www.TheStephenHall.com/novel-chapters. During its writing, he also kept a weekly video diary  chronicling the experiment.

Symphony Under Siege is now available as a paperback on Amazon and as an eBook on a number of platforms.

In September 2022, he released his third book 50 Things To Be Seriously Grateful For Today* *and 50 not-so-serious things to illustrate them , which he describes as "a very sincere, very silly non-fiction book... that also happens to be chock full of fiction".

Radio
From 1989 - 1993, Hall was one of the members of the late night (/ very early morning) comedy show The Marta Thripp Druidic Building Society Show TSP (in colour), on the Melbourne community radio station 3RRR. 

In 2015, he guest starred in the second series of Australian science fiction audio drama Night Terrace, playing the dual roles of Francisco de Cuellar and Sir Francis Drake in the episode "The Retirement of Horatio Gray". Originally available only as a digital download, the series was later broadcast on BBC Radio 4 Extra as part of their "7th Dimension" programme.

Quiz show champion
In August 2005, Hall completed seven nights on the quiz show Temptation, becoming the program's second Grand Champion, and the second largest quiz or game show winner in Australian television history (at that time), winning $672,357 in cash and prizes. The following year, he won the title of "Australia's Brainiest Quiz Master" on the Australian TV program of the same name and donating $20,000 to RSPCA and appeared as part of The Brains Trust on The Einstein Factor.

Since 2013, he has run the blog www.HowToWinGameShows.com, which aims to provide tips and hints for winning game shows.

References

External links
 TheStephenHall.com: Official blog, and home of the first draft of the novel.
 
 Professional biography and career résumé at Mollison Keightley Management

1969 births
Living people
Australian male film actors
Australian male television actors
Australian screenwriters
Actors from Melbourne
RMITV alumni